The Jesuit Missions of Moxos are located in the Llanos de Moxos of Beni department in eastern Bolivia. Distinguished by a unique fusion of European and Amerindian cultural influences, the missions were founded as reductions or reducciones de indios by Jesuits in the 17th and 18th centuries to convert local tribes to Christianity.

History
Jesuit priests arriving from Santa Cruz de la Sierra began evangelizing native peoples of the region in the 1670s. They set up a series of missions near the Mamoré River for this purpose beginning with Loreto. The principal mission was established at Trinidad in 1686.

List of missions
Meireles (1989) lists the following Jesuit missions of Moxos along with their respective ethnic groups (tribes). Founding dates and a few more additional missions are from Block (1994).

Languages

The following indigenous languages, which make up much of the Mamoré-Guaporé linguistic area, were historically spoken in the missions. Moxo was the primary lingua franca used in the missions.

Arawakan languages
Moxo, spoken by the Mojeños
Baure, spoken by the Baure people
Canichana, spoken by the Canichana people
Movima, spoken by the Movima people
Cayuvava, spoken by the Cayuvava people
Itonama, spoken by the Itonama people
Tsimané, spoken by the Tsimané people
Mure (extinct)
Chapacuran languages
Itene
Chapacura (extinct)
Napeca (extinct)
Rocorona (extinct)
Quitemo (extinct)
Tacanan languages
Reyesano (or Maropa)

Gallery

See also
List of Jesuit sites
List of Jesuit Missions of Chiquitos
Jesuit Missions of Chiquitos
Llanos de Moxos (archaeology)
Mojeños

References

 
Spanish missions in Bolivia
Jesuit missions
Jesuit history in South America
Buildings and structures in Beni Department
18th-century religious buildings and structures
18th century in the Viceroyalty of Peru